Dominic Shabbo born 26 January 1981 in Wimbledon, England is a rugby union player.

References

External links
London Irish profile
England profile

1986 births
Living people
Rugby union wings
English rugby union players
Rugby union players from Wimbledon